Ševko Okić (born 26 July 1988) is a Bosnian professional footballer who plays as a striker.

He previously played for Rudar Labin, Istra 1961, Velež Mostar, Sarajevo, Radnik Bijeljina and Čelik Zenica.

Career statistics

Club

Honours
Istra 1961 
2. HNL: 2008–09

Sarajevo 
Bosnian Premier League: 2014–15

References

External links
Ševko Okić at Footballdatabase

1988 births
Living people
People from Gračanica, Bosnia and Herzegovina
Association football forwards
Bosnia and Herzegovina footballers
NK Rudar Labin players
NK Istra 1961 players
FK Velež Mostar players
FK Sarajevo players
FK Radnik Bijeljina players
NK Čelik Zenica players
NK Neretva players
Croatian Football League players
First Football League (Croatia) players
Premier League of Bosnia and Herzegovina players
Bosnia and Herzegovina expatriate footballers
Expatriate footballers in Croatia
Bosnia and Herzegovina expatriate sportspeople in Croatia